Ke Hua (born 10 March 1960 in Huangshi, Hubei) is a Chinese sprint canoer who competed in the late 1980s. At the 1988 Summer Olympics in Seoul, he was eliminated in the repechages of the C-2 500 m event and eliminated in the semifinals of the C-2 1000 m event.

References

Sports-Reference.com profile

1960 births
Living people
People from Huangshi
Sportspeople from Hubei
Olympic canoeists of China
Canoeists at the 1988 Summer Olympics
Chinese male canoeists